John Julian Ganzoni, 2nd Baron Belstead, Baron Ganzoni,  (30 September 1932 – 3 December 2005) was a British Conservative politician and peer who served as Leader of the House of Lords under Margaret Thatcher from 1988 to 1990.

Background and education
Ganzoni was the only son of Sir John Ganzoni, a barrister and Conservative MP for Ipswich who was created Baron Belstead in 1938, and his wife Gwendolen Gertrude Turner, daughter of Arthur Turner, of Ipswich. He went to Eton before reading History at Christ Church, Oxford.

Political career
Belstead showed little interest in politics at first, and waited six years after succeeding to the peerage on his father's death in 1958 before making his maiden speech. In 1970, Edward Heath appointed him to become Parliamentary Under-Secretary to Margaret Thatcher at the Department of Education and Science; he was moved in the same rank to the Northern Ireland Office three years later. 

When Margaret Thatcher led the Tories back to power in 1979, she sent him to the Home Office. He was then made Minister at the Foreign Office when Lord Carrington and his team resigned after the Falklands invasion. In 1980, he was interviewed by the BBC's Panorama current affairs program about Britain's preparations for a nuclear attack.

He next moved to the Ministry of Fisheries and Food, and went back to the Education Department again before becoming Deputy Leader to William Whitelaw as Leader of the House of Lords. He succeeded Whitelaw in that post in 1988, taking the sinecure post of Lord Privy Seal at the same time. 

After losing his Cabinet seat, which he had gained when he became Lord Privy Seal, in 1990 he became Paymaster-General and Northern Ireland Minister under John Major, retiring from the Government to become Chairman of the Parole Board in 1992.

In the 1983 New Year Honours, he was sworn of the Privy Council. After the House of Lords Act 1999 removed the automatic right of hereditary peers to sit in the House of Lords, he was created a life peer (an honour given to all former Leaders of the House of Lords) as Baron Ganzoni, of Ipswich in the County of Suffolk on 17 November 1999. He also gave his name to the new "Belstead Centre" at Woodbridge School.

Personal life
Lord Belstead never married. He died in December 2005, aged 73, when both the hereditary peerage and the baronetcy became extinct. He is buried in the churchyard of St Mary's, Great Bealings, Suffolk.

He was an active Freemason and president of the Board of General Purposes for the United Grand Lodge of England. He was appointed to be a Deputy Lieutenant of the County of Suffolk on 2 April 1979.

Coat of arms

References

External links

Obituary, Guardian.co.uk. Accessed 8 January 2023.
Announcement of his taking the oath under his new title at the House of Lords House of Lords minutes of proceedings, 23 November 1999
Announcement of his death at the House of Lords House of Lords minutes of proceedings, 5 December 2005

|-

|-

|-

|-

|-

1932 births
2005 deaths
English people of Italian descent
Alumni of Christ Church, Oxford
Barons Belstead
Conservative Party (UK) hereditary peers
Ganzoni
Leaders of the House of Lords
Lord-Lieutenants of Suffolk
Lords Privy Seal
Members of the Privy Council of the United Kingdom
People educated at Eton College
Politicians from Ipswich
Freemasons of the United Grand Lodge of England
Northern Ireland Office junior ministers
Ganzoni
Life peers created by Elizabeth II
Belstead